Hunter Myles Mahan (born May 17, 1982) is an American professional golfer who plays on the PGA Tour. He is a winner of two World Golf Championship events, the 2010 WGC-Bridgestone Invitational and the 2012 WGC-Accenture Match Play Championship. 
Mahan has spent 19 weeks in the top-10 of the Official World Golf Ranking. He reached a career-high world ranking of No. 4 on April 1, 2012, becoming the highest ranked American golfer at the time.

Amateur career
Mahan was born in Orange, California. He had a successful amateur career, winning the 1999 5A Texas State High School Golf Championship while attending McKinney High School and the 1999 U.S. Junior Amateur.

After high school, Mahan enrolled at the University of Southern California, where he was named Pacific-10 Conference Freshman of the Year.  Mahan only played one year at USC before he transferred to Oklahoma State University, where he was a two-time Big 12 Conference Player of the Year and a two-time first-team All American. Mahan was the runner-up at the U.S. Amateur in 2002, in which he was defeated by Ricky Barnes 2 & 1. In 2003 he won the Haskins Award for outstanding collegiate golfer and was co-winner of the Ben Hogan Award.

Professional career
Mahan turned professional in 2003 and made it through qualifying school to earn a PGA Tour card for the 2004 season. His first PGA Tour victory, which came at the 2007 Travelers Championship, lifted Mahan into the top 100 of the Official World Golf Rankings.

In August 2007 Mahan entered the top 50 in the world rankings, and in that year finished 15th in the FedEx Cup. His performances in 2007 saw U.S. Presidents Cup captain Jack Nicklaus choose Mahan as one of two captain's picks for the U.S. team. By March 2008 he had reached the top 30.

On February 28, 2010, Mahan won his second PGA Tour event, beating Rickie Fowler by one stroke at the Waste Management Phoenix Open. On August 8, 2010, Mahan won his third PGA Tour title at the WGC-Bridgestone Invitational. He beat Ryan Palmer by 2 strokes.

Mahan won his second WGC tournament in February 2012 at the WGC-Accenture Match Play Championship. He defeated Rory McIlroy, 2 and 1, in the final.

Mahan recorded his fifth career PGA Tour victory in April at the Shell Houston Open and moved to fourth in the Official World Golf Ranking, making him the highest-ranked American for the first time. In defense of his title he won in 2012, Mahan reached the final of the 2013 WGC-Accenture Match Play Championship but was beaten 2&1 by Matt Kuchar.

In August 2014, Mahan won the first of the year's four FedEx Cup playoff events, The Barclays. He won by two strokes from Stuart Appleby, Jason Day and Cameron Tringale during a final round that saw six different players share the lead at some point. He birdied three of his last four holes to pull clear of the field. This was Mahan's first ever playoff victory and his sixth overall title on the PGA Tour.

Mahan was selected by Tom Watson as one of his three captain's picks for the 2014 Ryder Cup team, finishing with a record of 1–2–1 in the four matches he participated in. This included a halved match against Justin Rose in the singles competition.

Mahan began struggling with his golf game as of the 2015–16 PGA Tour season, during the next four years, Mahan finished 183rd, 130th, 159th and 184th in the season-long FedEx Cup rankings and had to compete in the Korn Ferry Tour Finals on multiple occasions to try to keep his full tour card. Between 2015–16 and 2020-21, Mahan had only one top-10 finish on the PGA Tour and 69 missed cuts. As of April 1st 2021, Mahan had fallen to 1738th in the Official World Golf Ranking.

Endorsements
Mahan's sponsors include Under Armour, Titleist, Ping, BioSteel Sports Supplements Inc., NetJets, FootJoy, Clubface Golf, RBC Golf Pigeon, and Ace Hardware.

Personal life
Mahan is one of four golfers in the PGA Tour boy band "Golf Boys" (with Rickie Fowler, Ben Crane, and Bubba Watson). The Golf Boys have a popular YouTube video for the song "Oh Oh Oh". Farmers Insurance donates $1,000 for every 100,000 views of the video. The charitable proceeds support both Farmers and Ben Crane charitable initiatives.

Mahan married Dallas Cowboys Cheerleader and Dallas Mavericks dancer Kandi Harris in 2011. On July 27, 2013, Mahan withdrew from the RBC Canadian Open before the third round after getting news that his wife had gone into labor. Mahan was the 36-hole leader at that point, taking a two-stroke advantage into the third round. A daughter, Zoe, was born early the next morning.  PING (one of his sponsors) created two gold-plated putters to celebrate her birth (the putters have her name, birthday, and vital statistics inscribed on them).

Amateur wins
1999 U.S. Junior Amateur, Western Junior

Professional wins (9)

PGA Tour wins (6)

PGA Tour playoff record (1–2)

Other wins (3)

Other playoff record (1–0)

Results in major championships

CUT = missed the half-way cut
"T" = tied

Summary

Most consecutive cuts made – 4 (twice)
Longest streak of top-10s – 2 (three times)

Results in The Players Championship

CUT = missed the halfway cut
WD = withdrew
"T" indicates a tie for a place

World Golf Championships

Wins (2)

Results timeline
Results not in chronological order before 2015.

QF, R16, R32, R64 = Round in which player lost in match play
"T" = tied
Note that the HSBC Champions did not become a WGC event until 2009.

U.S. national team appearances
Amateur
Junior Ryder Cup: 1999
Eisenhower Trophy: 2002 (winners)
Palmer Cup: 2002 (winners)

Professional
Presidents Cup: 2007 (winners), 2009 (winners), 2011 (winners), 2013 (winners)
Ryder Cup: 2008 (winners), 2010, 2014

See also
2003 PGA Tour Qualifying School graduates
2005 PGA Tour Qualifying School graduates
2018 Web.com Tour Finals graduates
List of golfers with most PGA Tour wins

References

External links

American male golfers
Oklahoma State Cowboys golfers
PGA Tour golfers
Ryder Cup competitors for the United States
Korn Ferry Tour graduates
Golfers from California
Golfers from Texas
Sportspeople from Orange, California
People from Colleyville, Texas
1982 births
Living people